Canine pancreatitis is inflammation of the pancreas that can occur in two very different forms. Acute pancreatitis is sudden, while chronic pancreatitis is characterized by recurring or persistent form of pancreatic inflammation. Cases of both can be considered mild or severe.

Background
The pancreas is composed of two sections: the smaller endocrine portion, which is responsible for producing hormones such as insulin, somatostatin, and glucagon, and the larger, exocrine portion, which produces enzymes needed for the digestion of food. Acinar cells make up 82% of the total pancreas; these cells are responsible for the production of the digestive enzymes.

Pathophysiology
Pancreatitis is caused by autodigestion of the pancreas thought to begin with an increase in secretion of pancreatic enzymes in response to a stimulus, which can be any source from table scraps to getting into the garbage to drugs, toxins, and trauma. The digestive enzymes are released too quickly and begin acting on the pancreas instead of the food they normally digest. Once the process cascades, inflammatory mediators and free radicals are released and pancreatitis develops, causing amplification of the process.

Clinical signs
The clinical signs can vary from mild gastrointestinal upset to death, with most dogs presenting with common gastrointestinal signs of upset, such as vomiting, anorexia, painful abdomen, hunched posture, diarrhea, fever, dehydration, and lack of energy, with vomiting being the most common symptom. These signs are not specific just for pancreatitis and may be associated with other gastrointestinal diseases and conditions.

Acute pancreatitis can trigger a build-up of fluid, particularly in abdominal and thoracic (chest) areas, acute kidney injury, and cause inflammation in arteries and veins.  The inflammation triggers the body's clotting factors, possibly depleting them to the point of spontaneous bleeding. This form can be fatal in animals and in humans.

Chronic pancreatitis can be present though no clinical signs of the disease are seen.

Pancreatitis can result in exocrine pancreatic insufficiency, if the organ's acinar cells are permanently damaged; the pancreatic enzymes then need replacement with pancrelipase or similar products.  The damage can also extend into the endocrine portion of the pancreas, resulting in diabetes mellitus. Whether the diabetes is transient (temporary) or permanent depends on the severity of the damage to the endocrine pancreas beta cells.

Risk factors
Although various causes of dog pancreatitis are known, such as drugs, fatty diet, trauma, etc., the pathophysiology is very complex. Pancreatitis can be idiopathic; no real causation factor can be found. Obese  animals as well as animals fed a diet high in fat may be more prone to developing acute and chronic pancreatitis. Certain breeds of dogs are considered predisposed to developing pancreatitis including Miniature Schnauzers, Cocker Spaniels, and some terrier breeds. Miniature Schnauzers as a breed tend toward developing hyperlipidemia, an excess of circulating fats in the blood. The breed that appears to be at risk for the acute form of pancreatitis is the Yorkshire Terrier, while Labrador Retrievers and Miniature Poodles seem to have a decreased risk for the acute form of the disease.  Genetics may play a part in the risk factor. Dogs suffering from diabetes mellitus, Cushing's disease (hyperadrenocorticism), hypothyroidism, and epilepsy are at increased risk for pancreatitis. Diabetes and hypothyroidism are also associated with hyperlipidemia. Those with other types of gastrointestinal conditions and dogs that have had previous pancreatitis attacks are also at increased risk for the disorder.

Treatment
No treatments for canine pancreatitis have been approved.  Treatment for this disease is supportive, and may require hospitalization to attend to the dog's nutritional and fluid needs, pain management, and addressing any other disease processes (infection, diabetes, etc.) while letting the pancreas heal on its own. Treatment often involves "resting" the pancreas for a short period of time by which the patient receives no food or fluids by mouth, but is fed and hydrated by intravenous fluids and a feeding tube. Dehydration  is also managed by the use of fluid therapy. However, a specialist from Texas A&M University has stated, "There is no evidence whatsoever that withholding food has any beneficial effect." Other specialists have agreed with his opinion.

Canine pancreatitis is complex, often limiting the ability to approach the disease.

Postpancreatitis management
A low-fat diet is indicated. The use of drugs that are known to have an association with pancreatitis should be avoided. Some patients benefit from the use of pancreatic enzymes on a supplemental basis.  One study indicated that 57% dogs followed for six months after an acute pancreatitis attack, either continued to exhibit inflammation of the organ or had decreased acinar cell function, though they had no pancreatitis symptoms.

See also
 Pancreatitis

References

Pancreatitis